In mathematics, the Peterson–Stein formula, introduced by ,  describes the Spanier–Whitehead dual of a secondary cohomology operation.

References

Theorems in algebraic topology